Foley is a city and the county seat of Benton County, Minnesota, United States. The population was 2,603 at the 2010 census.

Foley is part of the St. Cloud Metropolitan Statistical Area.

History
Foley was named for its founder, John Foley.

Geography

Minnesota State Highways 23 and 25 are two of the main routes in the city.

Demographics

2010 census
As of the census of 2010, there were 2,603 people, 964 households, and 631 families living in the city. The racial makeup of the city was 97.7% White, 0.8% African American, 0.3% Native American, 0.1% Asian, 0.2% from other races, and 1.0% from two or more races. Hispanic or Latino of any race were 0.8% of the population.

There were 964 households, of which 39.6% had children under the age of 18 living with them, 47.2% were married couples living together, 12.1% had a female householder with no husband present, 6.1% had a male householder with no wife present, and 34.5% were non-families. 27.7% of all households were made up of individuals, and 15.4% had someone living alone who was 65 years of age or older. The average household size was 2.55 and the average family size was 3.13.

The median age in the city was 31.6 years. 29% of residents were under the age of 18; 8.3% were between the ages of 18 and 24; 29.9% were from 25 to 44; 18.4% were from 45 to 64; and 14.4% were 65 years of age or older. The gender makeup of the city was 49.1% male and 50.9% female.

2000 census
As of the census of 2000, there were 2,154 people, 756 households, and 499 families living in the city. The racial makeup of the city was 97.21% White, 1.35% African American, 0.37% Native American, 0.46% Asian, 0.09% from other races, and 0.51% from two or more races. Hispanic or Latino of any race were 0.46% of the population.

There were 756 households, out of which 39.2% had children under the age of 18 living with them, 50.5% were married couples living together, 11.5% had a female householder with no husband present, and 33.9% were non-families. 30.0% of all households were made up of individuals, and 16.1% had someone living alone who was 65 years of age or older.  The average household size was 2.60 and the average family size was 3.23.

In the city, the population was spread out, with 27.6% under the age of 18, 11.7% from 18 to 24, 27.6% from 25 to 44, 15.2% from 45 to 64, and 17.8% who were 65 years of age or older.  The median age was 33 years. For every 100 females, there were 99.8 males.  For every 100 females age 18 and over, there were 93.2 males.

The median income for a household in the city was $38,393, and the median income for a family was $48,750. Males had a median income of $32,466 versus $21,731 for females. The per capita income for the city was $17,168.  About 6.1% of families and 9.4% of the population were below the poverty line, including 8.8% of those under age 18 and 20.7% of those age 65 or over.

Media
The Benton County News is a weekly newspaper headquartered in Foley. It is published on Tuesdays and is owned by Star Publications.

References

External links
City Website
Foley Photo Gallery

Cities in Minnesota
Cities in Benton County, Minnesota
County seats in Minnesota
St. Cloud, Minnesota metropolitan area